Islamabad Capital Territory Police, also known as Islamabad Police, is a police force formed in 1981 to police Islamabad Capital Territory, Pakistan under administrative control of the Chief Commissioner, Islamabad Capital Territory Administration. The force is headed by a senior officer (BS-21) of the Police Service of Pakistan, who serves as the Inspector General of the law enforcement agency.

History 
The ICT Police was formed via a Presidential Order No. 17 and 18, in 1980.

Departments 

Islamabad Traffic Police
Islamabad City Police
Counter Terrorism Department

Services

24-hour Helpline
Emergency help
Theft Reporting Counter
Child Lost and Found Center
Gender Protection Unit
Medical Unit
Blood Donor's Directory
Security Alarm System
Mobile Forensic Lab
Bomb Disposal Squad
Quick Response Unit
Counter Terrorism Unit

Vehicles

City Police

Honda Civic (seventh generation)
Honda Civic (eighth generation)
Toyota Corolla
Toyota Hilux
Foton Tunland
Honda CB125

Traffic Police

Toyota Corolla
Toyota Prius
Foton Tunland
Honda CBR250F
Suzuki Inazuma 250

Crime Investigation Agency (CIA)

CIA is the Investigation Wing of Islamabad Capital Territory Police working under the supervision of a Superintendent of Police (SP). It is responsible for tracing out heinous cases referred to it by SSP
Islamabad. The office of CIA Wing is located in I-9 Markaz and is usually run by a Deputy superintendent of police (DSP) ranked officer who heads around 70 officers. The wing has developed specialized skills over the years to locate gang members and other criminals. Overall, it had busted many gangs and criminals since it came into existence. The Anti Car Lifting Cell (ACLC) is another wing of CIA. It is headed by an Inspector having 48 personnel.

Islamabad Police Ranks

Inspector Generals

Picture gallery

City Police

Traffic Police

See also
 Law enforcement in Pakistan

References

External links
 Official Website
 Islamabad Traffic Police website

Islamabad
Federal law enforcement agencies of Pakistan
Organizations established in 1981
1981 establishments in Pakistan
Government agencies established in 1981
Ministry of Interior (Pakistan)
Islamabad Capital Territory Police